The Don Is Dead is a 1973 American crime film directed by Richard Fleischer and written by Christopher Trumbo, Michael Butler, and Marvin H. Albert, adapted from Albert's novel of the same name. It stars Anthony Quinn, Frederic Forrest, Robert Forster, Al Lettieri, and Angel Tompkins.

It was released by Universal Pictures on November 14, 1973, and received mixed reviews.

Plot
Frank is the ambitious son of an organized-crime boss. He plans a heroin deal with the help of brothers Tony and Vince, but a snitch tips off the cops.

After the death of his father, a mob war breaks out between two rival families. One is run by Don Angelo, but he does not get the support of the brothers, Tony and Vince, and must seek power through other means. He begins a romance with Frank's young and beautiful fiancee, Ruby, which sends Frank into a self-destructive rage.

Cast
 Anthony Quinn as Don Angelo DiMorra
 Frederic Forrest as Tony Fargo
 Robert Forster as Frank Regalbuto
 Al Lettieri as Vince Fargo
 Angel Tompkins as Ruby Dunne
 Charles Cioffi as Luigi Orlando
 Barry Russo as Don Aggimio Bernardo
 Louis Zorich as Mitch DiMorra
 Ina Balin as Nella
 Joe Santos as Joe Lucci
 Frank DeKova as Giunta
 Abe Vigoda as Don Talusso
 Victor Argo as Augie the Horse
 Val Bisoglio as Pete Lazatti
 Robert Carricart as Mike Spada
 Sid Haig as The Arab
 Vic Tayback as Ralph Negri

Reception
A.H. Weiler of The New York Times was positive: "Expertise, if not imagination, is evident in the explosive, action-oriented direction of Richard Fleischer... The Don Is Dead has the attributes of some lively, pithily accented performances that are adult and effectively natural. Among these are Forrest, as the brainly hood who attempts to escape the racket, but winds up a don, Al Lettieri, as his roughhewn, dependent, ill-fated brother, and Forster, as the rising, vengeful muscleman who is eventually cut down.
As the embattled don who is finally felled by a stroke, not a gun, Quinn is moodily menacing and as polished and relaxed as a professional long familiar with this sort of role."

See also
 List of American films of 1973

References

External links

 
 
 

1973 films
1970s crime drama films
American crime drama films
Films scored by Jerry Goldsmith
Films directed by Richard Fleischer
Films produced by Hal B. Wallis
Films about the American Mafia
Universal Pictures films
1973 drama films
1970s English-language films
1970s American films